= 1967 war =

1967 war may refer to:

- Cambodian Civil War (1967–1975), a conflict between the communists (Khmer Rouge) and the government forces of Cambodia
- Nigerian Civil War (1967–1970), a civil war in Nigeria caused by the attempted secession of Biafra
- Six-Day War (1967), a war between Israel and Egypt, Jordan and Syria
